Dog Lake is a lake in Yosemite National Park. It is a shallow but very cold lake, which is good for water sports. It is near to Dog Dome, is north, of  Lembert Dome, and south, of Ragged Peak.

See also
List of lakes in California

References

Lakes of Tuolumne County, California
Lakes of Yosemite National Park